The Australian Football League's 2007 Finals Series determined the top eight final positions of the 2007 AFL season. It began on the weekend of 7 September 2007 and ended with the 111th AFL Grand Final at the Melbourne Cricket Ground on 29 September 2007. The Geelong Football Club were crowned the 2007 AFL Premiers, beating the Port Adelaide Football Club by 119 points to win their first premiership since 1963.

The eight teams qualified for the finals series by finishing in the top eight positions of the premiership ladder at the completion of the home and away series.

Ladder

Geelong was easily the minor premier in 2007 and undisputed favourite coming into the Finals Series.

Summary of results

The finals system 

The system is a final eight system. This system is different to the McIntyre final eight system, which was previously used by the AFL.

The top four teams in the eight receive what is popularly known as the "double chance" when they play in week-one qualifying finals; this means that if a top-four team loses in the first week, it still has a chance to redeem itself by getting a chance to play in a semi-final the next week against the winner of an elimination final. The bottom four of the eight are forced to play what are called elimination finals, in which only the winners survive and move on to week two to play the losers of the qualifying finals.

In the second week, the winners of the qualifying finals receive a bye to the third week, while the losers of those qualifying finals must play the winners of the elimination finals for a chance to play the qualifying finals winners. Home-ground advantage goes to the team with the higher seed.

In the third week, the winners of the semi-finals from week two play the winners of the qualifying finals in the first week, with the latter receiving home-ground advantage. The winners of those matches move on to the Grand Final at the Melbourne Cricket Ground in Melbourne, where the new premier will be crowned.

Week One

First Qualifying Final (Geelong vs. North Melbourne)

Second Qualifying Final (Port Adelaide vs. West Coast)

First Elimination Final (Hawthorn vs. Adelaide)

Second Elimination Final (Collingwood vs. Sydney)

Week Two

First Semi-final (North Melbourne vs. Hawthorn)

Second semi final (West Coast vs Collingwood)

Scores were tied at the end of regulation time, with both teams having scored 10.12 (72). Two five-minute periods of extra time were played to decide a winner. This was only the second time that extra time had been implemented since the provision to do so was introduced in the early 1990s. In two coincidences, it was the drawn qualifying final between these two teams in 1990 which most directly led to the introduction of the extra time provision in the first place, and; it was the pairing of the weekend's other game, Hawthorn and the North Melbourne, who contested the only previous game to require extra time.

Week Three

First Preliminary Final (Geelong vs. Collingwood)

Second Preliminary Final (Port Adelaide vs. North Melbourne)

Week Four

Grand Final (Geelong vs. Port Adelaide)

See also 
2007 AFL Season

Notes and references
AFL final eight system

External links
 AFL official website
 RealFooty by The Age (Melbourne) Online 
 SportsAustralia (news and views)

AFL Finals Series
Finals series